The adyton ('innermost sanctuary, shrine') or  (Latin) was a restricted area within the cella of a Greek or Roman temple. The adyton was frequently a small area at the farthest end of the cella from the entrance: at Delphi it measured just . The adyton often would house the cult image of the deity.

Adyta were spaces reserved for oracles, priestesses, priests, or acolytes, and not for the general public. Adyta were found frequently associated with temples of Apollo, as at Didyma, Bassae, Clarus, Delos, and Delphi, although they were also said to have been natural phenomena (see the story of Nyx). Those sites often had been dedicated to deities whose worship preceded that of Apollo and may go back to prehistoric eras, such as Delphi, but who were supplanted by the time of Classical Greek culture.

In modern usage, the term is sometimes extended to similar spaces in other cultural contexts, as in Egyptian temples or the Western mystery school, Builders of the Adytum.

The term abaton ('inaccessible') or avato is used in the same sense in Greek Orthodox tradition, usually of the parts of monasteries accessible only to monks or only to male visitors.

Truncated variants of the term, adyt or adyte (plural: adites, addittes, adyts) are found in English as early as the late 16th century. By the early 19th century, the term acquired a figurative meaning, referring to the innermost parts of any structure or of the human psyche.

See also
Holy of Holies
Inner sanctum
Sanctuary
Sanctum sanctorum
Mahavira Hall and Hondo, sometimes translated as adytum

Sources
Broad, William J. The Oracle: The lost secrets and hidden messages of ancient Delphi. Penguin Press, 2006

References

Adyton
Ancient Greek architecture